San Benedetto in Perillis is a town and comune in the province of L'Aquila, Abruzzo, central Italy.

History
In the High Middle Ages, a monastery was built here to serve the peasantry of L'Aquila. Charles V of Spain later granted the lands around the town to one of the captains of his army. Eventually, the Caracciolo family took control of the area, being replaced in the 18th century by the Celestine Fathers of L'Aquila.

Main sights
Church of S. Benedict
Church of S. Maria delle Grazie

In popular culture
The movie Ladyhawke (1985) was filmed in the monastery of San Benedetto.

Gallery

References

External links
 Official website
Italian History Site
Italian Surname Site

Cities and towns in Abruzzo